Zaw Win is a Burmese politician who currently serves as Minister of Social Affairs  for Sagaing Region and MP  for Ayadaw Township №.1.

Political career 
In the 2015 Myanmar general election, he was elected as a Sagaing Region Hluttaw MP, winning a majority of 32,754 votes, from Ayadaw Township No.1  parliamentary constituency. He also serving as a Regional Minister of Social Affairs  for Sagaing Region and as chairman of Sagaing Region Youth Affairs Committee.

References

National League for Democracy politicians
Living people
People from Sagaing Region
Year of birth missing (living people)